Diplomatic relations exist between Armenia and Chile. There are over 600 Armenians and descendants residing in Chile today. Both nations are members of the United Nations.

History

During and soon after the Armenian genocide; many Armenians boarded ships for "America" not knowing that the ships were heading to South America. The first Armenians to arrive to Chile settled in the town of Llay-Llay, close to the port of Valparaíso. In the 1940s, the Chilean government encouraged immigration to the country, and as a result, more Armenians arrived and settled in Chile. On 26 December 1991, Armenia regained its independence after the Dissolution of the Soviet Union. On 15 April 1993, Armenia and Chile established diplomatic relations.

In 2007, the Chilean government recognized the Armenian Genocide. In 2010, Armenia appointed an honorary consul in Santiago. In July 2014, Armenian President Serzh Sargsyan paid an official visit to Chile. During the visit, President Sargsyan met with Chilean President Michelle Bachelet and both leaders discussed a wide range of issues with regard to strengthening the Armenian-Chilean bilateral relations and making joint efforts at promoting cooperation in a number of promising areas. Both leaders signed a Memorandum of Mutual Understanding on Cooperation between both nations Ministry's of Foreign Affairs. In 2016, Chile appointed a resident honorary consul in Yerevan.

In April 2018, both nations celebrated 25 years of diplomatic relations. That same year, both nations abolished visas for holders of diplomatic and official passports between Armenia and Chile.

Trade
In 2018, trade between Armenia and Chile totaled US$1.9 million. Armenia's main export to Chile is iron ore. Chile's main exports to Armenia include fish and alcoholic beverages (wine).

Diplomatic missions

 Armenia is accredited to Chile from its embassy in Buenos Aires, Argentina and maintains an honorary consulate in Santiago.
 Chile is accredited to Armenia from its embassy in Moscow, Russia and maintains an honorary consulate in Yerevan.

See also 
 Foreign relations of Armenia 
 Foreign relations of Chile
 Armenian diaspora

References 

 
Chile
Armenia